Caesar Palace is an Italian Rock band that was formed in 2008. Their debut album was released at the end of 2008. The band was the successful mix of some elements from two Italian bands that are both from Turin, Subsonica and Linea 77.

Members
 Boosta (Davide Dileo) (from Subsonica) - vocalist and keyboardist
 Dade (Davide Pavanello) (from Linea 77) - bassist
 Tozzo (Christian Montanarella) (from Linea 77) - drummer

Discography

Albums

 Dogs from V-Gas

Luxury Lark - 4:44
Martyr Mask - 3:41
1ne - 3:40
In Nebula - 2:01
Red Sofa Vampire - 3:51
Firedoll - 3:59
12 A.M. in V-Gas - 4:36
My Ring - 3:48
End of (the) Galaxy - 2:11
God and Ants - 2:55
Spiders from (the) Sky - 4:14
U.F.O. - 2:13

Singles
 2008 1ne
 2009 God and Ants

Italian rock music groups